Treasure Island Shopping Center is a defunct shopping center located in Cianjhen District, Kaohsiung, Taiwan. On 31 March 2015, the mall ended operation.

Design and facilities

Since Treasure Island Shopping Center is located around the Port of Kaohsiung, the  mall takes the ships sailing the sea as the overall design image: empty ground squares, parking lots are like the endless sea, and the sea is dotted with giant lighthouses and pirate ships.  The entire mall can also be regarded as a giant ship. The ground floor is a vast ship deck. Through the central sunken starlight stage and the multiple entrances and exits around it, the ground floor deck and the business space of the basement cabin are connected.

In the early days of its opening, artist autograph meetings were held and there were occasional performances in the Starlight Stage on the basement floor. Large-scale book fairs, wedding fairs, and furniture fairs will be held from time to time in the exhibition space surrounding the stage in the mall. In the later stage of operation, a small open-air coffee shop was added to the square on the ground floor to provide a leisure function for watching the night view of the harbor.

See also
List of tourist attractions in Taiwan
Treasure Island Next Mall

References 

1999 establishments in Taiwan
Shopping malls established in 1999
Shopping malls in Kaohsiung
Defunct shopping malls in Taiwan
2015 disestablishments in Taiwan
Shopping malls disestablished in 2015